

Duchesses of Bosnia
The Duke of Bosnia, Ladislaus of Hungary, was engaged to Judith of Poland for a time but the engagement was broken off. Ladislaus did have a wife whose name is unknown.

| Maria of Bosniac. 1353–1403||  || daughter of Stephen II of Bosnia || Ulrich V, Count of Helfenstein6 children|| 27 April 1403
|-
|}

Banesses of Bosnia

| Elizabeth of Serbia1283–1314|| || daughter of Stephen Dragutin of Serbia || Stephen I5 children|| c. 1331
|-
| Elizabeth of Kuyavia1315/20 – after 22 August 1345|| || daughter of Kazimierz III of Gniewkowo || Stephen II number of children disputed (at least one) || c. 22 August 1345
|-
| Dorothea of Bulgaria1374–1377|| 
 || daughter of Ivan Sratsimir of Bulgaria || Tvrtko IIlinci8 December 1374no children || before 1390
|-
|}

Queens of Bosnia

| Dorothea of Bulgaria26 October 1377 – 1390
| 
| daughter of Ivan Sratsimir of Bulgaria
| Tvrtko IIlinci8 December 1374no children
| before 1390
|-
| Jelena Gruba10 March 1391 – 8 September 1395
|
| Nikolić family
| Jelena Gruba one daughter
| after March 1399
|-
| Vitača1398–1399
|
| commoner
| Stephen Ostojano children||
|-
| Kujava Radinović1399–14041409–1418
|
| daughter of Radin Jablanić
| Stephen Ostojaone son
| after 1421
|-
| Jelena Nelipčić1416–1418
|
| daughter of Ivan II Nelipčić
| Hrvoje Vukčić Hrvatinićpossibly one sonStephen Ostojano children|| 1423
|-
| Dorothy Garai1428–1438
| 
| daughter of John Garai and Hedwig of Masovia
| Tvrtko IIspring 1428no children
| September 1438
|-
| Katarina Kosača26 May 1446 – 10 July 1461
| 
| daughter of Stjepan Vukčić and Jelena Balšić
| Stephen Thomastwo children
| 25 October 1478
|-
| Marija Branković10 July 1461 – 5 June 1463
|
| daughter of Lazar Branković and Helena Palaiologina
| Stephen TomaševićSmederevo1 April 1459
| after 1498
|-
|}

See also
List of dukes of Bosnia
List of grand dukes of Bosnia
List of Hungarian consorts, who held the title of Queen of Rama relating to Bosnia

Bosnia
Bosnia
Bosnia
c